Wais Daoud Wais (born 6 December 1986) is a Djiboutian professional footballer who plays as a defender for Djiboutian club Arta/Solar7 and the Djibouti national team.

Career statistics

International 

Scores and results list Djibouti's goal tally first, score column indicates score after each Wais goal.

Honours
ASAS Djibouti Télécom
 Djibouti Premier League: 2012–13, 2013–14, 2014–15, 2015–16, 2016–17, 2017–18

Arta/Solar7
 Djibouti Premier League: 2020–2021, 2021–2022
 Djibouti Cup: 2020–2021, 2021–2022
 Djibouti Super Cup: 2020, 2022

References

External links
 
 
 

1986 births
Living people
People from Djibouti (city)
Djiboutian footballers
Association football defenders
AS Ali Sabieh/Djibouti Télécom players
AS Arta/Solar7 players
Djibouti Premier League players
Djibouti international footballers